Lola Lemire Tostevin (born June 15, 1937 in Timmins, Ontario) is a Canadian poet and novelist. Although not widely known among the general public, she is one of Canada's leading feminist writers, and a prominent figure in Canadian literary analysis.

Despite being Franco-Ontarian, born of French-speaking parents and with French as her first language, Tostevin writes primarily in English. She has, however, published work in French as well, and has translated several notable Canadian authors, both English and French, for publication in the other language.

Her work often deals with international themes, and is similar in this way to Hédi Bouraoui.

Bibliography
Color of Her Speech (1982)
Gyno Text (1983)
Double Standards (1985)
Sophie (1988)
La danse éliminatoire (1991, translation of Michael Ondaatje's Elimination Dance)
Frog Moon (1994, novel)
Cartouches (1995)
Subject to Criticism (1995, essays)
Day Has No Equal But the Night (1997, translation of Le Jour n'a d'égal que la nuit by Anne Hébert)
The Jasmine Man (2001, novel)
Site-Specific Poems (2004)
Punctum (2007)
The other sister (2008, novel)
"Singed Wings" (2013, poems)
"At the Risk of Sounding" (2015 essays)

See also

 List of French Canadian writers from outside Quebec.

References

1937 births
Living people
20th-century Canadian novelists
20th-century Canadian poets
21st-century Canadian novelists
21st-century Canadian poets
Canadian feminists
Canadian women novelists
Canadian women poets
Franco-Ontarian people
Writers from Timmins
Canadian poets in French
20th-century Canadian women writers
21st-century Canadian women writers
Canadian novelists in French
20th-century Canadian translators
21st-century Canadian translators
Canadian women non-fiction writers